"Body Talk" is the debut single by English trio Imagination, taken from their debut studio album, Body Talk (1981). It is their second biggest single on the UK Singles Chart, reaching a peak of number four, just behind their 1982 hits "Just an Illusion" (#2), but just ahead of "Music and Lights" (#5).

"Body Talk" was written by Steve Jolley and Tony Swain from the record production team Jolley & Swain, along with Leee John and Ashley Ingram from Imagination. It was arranged and produced by Jolley & Swain.

Track listing and formats

7-inch vinyl single
A – "Body Talk" – 3:35
B – "Body Talk" (Instrumental) – 5:15

12-inch vinyl single
A – "Body Talk" – 6:20
B – "Body Talk" (Instrumental) – 5:15

Charts

References

Imagination (band) songs
1981 songs
1981 debut singles
Songs written by Steve Jolley (songwriter)
Songs written by Tony Swain (musician)
Songs written by Leee John
Songs written by Ashley Ingram
Song recordings produced by Jolley & Swain